Ross Dam is a -high, -long concrete thin arch dam across the Skagit River, forming Ross Lake. Both dam and reservoir are located in Ross Lake National Recreation Area, is bordered on both sides by Stephen Mather Wilderness and combined with Lake Chelan National Recreation Area they make up North Cascades National Park Complex.

The other two dams are Diablo Dam, directly below Ross Dam, and Gorge Dam, further downstream. Ross Dam can generate up to 460 MW of electricity.

History

Planning and early construction
Prior to construction of the dam the Skagit Gorge upstream of the dam was a wild, free flowing, completely undeveloped area. The canyon held an intact ancient forest of Douglas Fir, Western Hemlock and Western Redcedar, estimated to be millable into up to 340 million usable board feet of timber. With the creation of the Skagit River Hydroelectric Project in the 1910s, the first two dams, Gorge Dam and Diablo Dam, were constructed downstream of the Ross Dam site. In 1937, construction began on the dam, originally slated to be called Ruby Dam, on the first two of four planned construction phases. The name originates from Ruby Creek, a Skagit River tributary that flows southwest to meet the Skagit just upstream of the dam site. While the reservoir filled, the Decco-Walton Logging Company was formed in 1945 with the awarding of a contract from Seattle City Light. Decco-Walton logged the Skagit Gorge as Ross Lake slowly rose, and floated logs up the river to British Columbia, where it was hauled to the Fraser River. By the time Ross Lake filled, only 30 million board feet remained in the basin, less than 10% of the original timber.

Third phase

In 1939, superintendent of the Skagit Hydroelectric Project James Delmage Ross has died, so Ruby Dam was renamed Ross Dam in his memory. Energy demands during World War II coincided with an energy shortage in Seattle, requiring that the dam be constructed quickly, but the dam did not generate any power until many years after the war ended. This height would cause the reservoir at full pool to extend slightly past the Washington-British Columbia border. The reservoir, however, did not fill past the national border until 1954. Two years prior to the reservoir reaching full pool, construction of the Ross Dam power plant began, and two turbines first went on line in 1956, generating 360 MW of power. Another two generators were added later, increasing the capacity to its current 460 MW.

High Ross Dam

A controversy later arose over the planned fourth stage of the construction of Ross Dam. This argument over land became known as the High Ross Dam Controversy. The stepped "concrete waffle" facing on the front of the dam was designed to accommodate this addition to the height. This would have flooded land into Canada approximately  further, also extending up the Klesilkwa River, a Skagit River tributary, and provided the opportunity to generate about 272 MW of extra power, bringing the generating capacity to 732 MW. It wasn't until the 1970s when the High Ross project was finally ended. On the US side, the North Cascades Conservation Council inventoried the ancient forest of Big Beaver Creek which would have been flooded, and showed that City Light's statements that no unique forest environments would be lost were not true. On the Canadian side the raising of the dam was halted primarily by the extensive work by Curley Chittenden - logger turned environmentalist, who worked tirelessly to rally opposition to this additional flooding of the upper Skagit River basin. Ultimately a treaty was signed between the City of Seattle and Province of British Columbia to supply Seattle with the equivalent amount of power from other, existing dams in British Columbia in exchange for Seattle not raising the dam. The Skagit Environmental Endowment Commission was created at this time to oversee joint USA/Canada stewardship of the upper Skagit River watershed.

Description

The North Cascades mountains rise nearly  vertically from the floor of the canyon and surround it on both sides. Directly upstream of the dam, Ruby Creek flows into the reservoir, forming the Ruby Arm of Ross Lake. Directly downstream, Diablo Dam forms Diablo Lake, much smaller than Ross Lake. Other creeks that flow into Ross Lake include Little Beaver Creek and Big Beaver Creek from the west, and Lightning Creek from the east. North Cascades Highway, also known as Washington State Route 20, follows the Skagit River to where it turns away from the river at Ross Dam and follows Ruby Creek instead.

The power plant of Ross Dam is located just downstream of its base and produces 460 MW of power from four hydroelectric turbines. The dam has two over-the-crest spillways on its flanks, each with six individual spillway bays.

See also
List of world's tallest dams
List of dams in the United States

References

External links
Historic American Engineering Record (HAER) documentation, filed under Newhalem, Whatcom County, WA:

Dams in Washington (state)
Seattle City Light dams
Buildings and structures in Whatcom County, Washington
Historic American Engineering Record in Washington (state)
North Cascades of Washington (state)
United States power company dams
Dams completed in 1949
Energy infrastructure completed in 1949
Arch dams
Dams on the Skagit River